Kimberly Ann Director (born November 13, 1974) is an American actress. She has played the roles of Kim Diamond in Book of Shadows: Blair Witch 2 (2000), and Stevie in Inside Man (2006). Beginning in 2017, she has appeared as a recurring guest star on the HBO series The Deuce.

Early life
Raised in suburban Pittsburgh, Pennsylvania, Director graduated from Upper St. Clair High School in Upper St. Clair in 1993. She graduated from Carnegie Mellon University in 1997.

Career
Director's first film role was in 1998's He Got Game, directed by Spike Lee. This was followed by Summer of Sam in 1999 and Bamboozled in 2000, both films also directed by Lee. Her breakout performance came in the film Book of Shadows: Blair Witch 2 as the hard-core Goth girl, Kim Diamond. She went on to act in the independent films Unforeseen, Tony n' Tina's Wedding, Charlie's Party, Live Free or Die, Life is Short, and A Crime  with Harvey Keitel. Director reunited with Spike Lee for the film She Hate Me in 2004, and in 2006 played Stevie the bank robber in Lee's Inside Man.

Kim Director has appeared in guest roles on television shows Sex and the City, Law & Order, Law & Order: Criminal Intent, CSI: Miami, Shark, Life, Cold Case, Unforgettable, and Orange is the New Black. She had a recurring role as the Cavewoman on the series Cavemen.

Her later roles include HBO's The Deuce and the Bianca in the Netflix series She's Gotta Have It.

Director is a trained stage actress and appeared in the Stephen Sondheim and George Furth musical Company at the Kennedy Center. She also appeared in the play Guinea Pig Solo by Brett C. Leonard at the Public Theater with LAByrinth Theater Company (Philip Seymour Hoffman and John Ortiz, artistic directors). She also worked at the Rattlestick Playwrights Theater in New York in the play The Wood written by Dan Klores and directed by David Bar Katz.

Filmography

Film

Television

References

External links
 
 

1974 births
Actresses from Pittsburgh
American film actresses
American television actresses
Carnegie Mellon University College of Fine Arts alumni
Living people
Upper St. Clair High School alumni